Qaleh-ye Sefid or Qaleh-ye Safid or Qaleh Sefid or Qaleh Safid or Qalehsefid may refer to:
 Qaleh Sefid, Bushehr
 Qaleh Sefid, Fars
 Qaleh Sefid, Ilam
 Qaleh Sefid, Isfahan
 Qaleh Sefid, Ravansar, Kermanshah Province
 Qaleh Sefid, Salas-e Babajani, Kermanshah Province
 Qaleh Sefid-e Sheykh Hasan, Kermanshah Province
 Qaleh Sefid, Khuzestan
 Qaleh-ye Sefid, North Khorasan
 Qaleh Sefid, Razavi Khorasan

See also
 Qaleh Sefid-e Olya (disambiguation)
 Qaleh Sefid-e Sofla (disambiguation)